Nikki Ross (born February 26, 1974) is an American gospel singer, pianist, arranger and composer from Houston, Texas. 

She has worked as a vocalist and arranger
for artist such as Kirk Franklin, Ricky Dillard, Harry Connick Jr., Kim Burrell, Gladys Knight, Robert Glasper, PJ Morton, Dorinda Clark Cole, Smokie Norful, Martha Munizzi, Earnest Pugh, and Shaun Martin.

As well as being an accomplished vocalist Nikki Ross is also a skilled pianist and organist. She cities Stevie Wonder as a major musical influence and like him she also possesses absolute pitch. Other musical influences include  Ella Fitzgerald, The Clark Sisters, and gospel music legend Bettye Ransom Nelson. 

In reference to working with her on his 2007 Grammy award winning album, The Fight Of My Life, Kirk Franklin refers to Nikki as a “musical genius” in the album credits.

Grammy winning Jazz musician Harry Connick Jr. recognizes Nikki as one of his most favorite musicians.

Gospel artist Gary Mayes was quoted speaking about Nikki to gospel music website GospelFlava, “She brings an unbelievable presence. She's always been compared to Kim Burrell and Karen Clark-Sheard, but Nikki is her own! She has perfect pitch and she plays keyboard when she sings. With her vocal talent, she will go somewhere totally different that what you can grasp with your physical ear. It's almost unexplainable.”

References

External links 
https://www.allmusic.com/artist/nikki-ross-mn0000410342
http://pathmegazine.com/news/gospel/famed-singer-nikki-ross-launches-solo-career-with-single-ready-for-change-launches-fundraising-campaign/

American gospel singers
Musicians from Houston
1974 births
Living people